Air Costa Rica was an airline based in Juan Santamaría International Airport, San José, Costa Rica. The airline, a subsidiary of Air Panama, commenced operations in December 2015 with a fleet of one Boeing 737-300 aircraft. It mainly connected neighboring South and Central American cities from its hub in San Jose.

History
On 5 August 2015 the airline received its air operator's certificate from the Costa Rican aviation regulator and became eligible to start commercial operation, although the carrier did not commence operations until December 2015.

The airline ceased operations in 2018.

Destinations (planned)
The airline had expressed its intention of initially flying to the following cities. 
Bogotá El Dorado International Airport 
Guatemala City La Aurora International Airport 
Guayaquil José Joaquín de Olmedo International Airport 
Lima Jorge Chavez International Airport 
Managua Managua International Airport 
Panama City Tocumen International Airport
Rio Hato Scarlett Martínez International Airport
Roatan Juan Manuel Galvez International Airport

Fleet
The Air Costa Rica fleet consisted of the following aircraft (as of August 2017):

References 

 https://web.archive.org/web/20170412063338/http://avcodes.co.uk/details.asp?ID=14230

Defunct airlines of Costa Rica
Airlines established in 2015
Airlines disestablished in 2018